Tomer Chencinski (born December 1, 1984) is an Israeli-Canadian soccer player who plays the position of goalkeeper. He played college soccer at Robert Morris University, where in 2004 he ranked 16th in the nation in saves per game, and at Fairleigh Dickinson University. He most recently played for Irish club Shamrock Rovers. He also played one match for the Canada men's national soccer team.

Early life 

Chencinski was born in Bat Yam, Israel, to Jewish parents originally from Poland.  He and his family lived in Israel until he was eight years old, before moving to Thornhill, Canada, where he grew up. He attended Chapel School. He played youth soccer for the North York Hearts.

He speaks both English and Hebrew fluently.

Playing career

College 

Chencinski played two years of college soccer at Robert Morris University, where in 2004 he ranked 16th in the nation in saves per game and recorded six shutouts. He transferred to Fairleigh Dickinson University as a junior, where he played his final two collegiate seasons.

Toronto FC 

Chencinski turned professional in 2007 when he signed with Major League Soccer side Toronto FC after impressing during a tryout, but never made an appearance for the team, and left to play indoor soccer for Major Indoor Soccer League side Detroit Ignition.

Nistru Otaci 

He dropped down a division to play in the USL Premier Development League for expansion side Newark Ironbound Express in 2008, but left mid-season when he was offered a contract by Moldova National Division side Nistru Otaci.

Harrisburg City Islanders 

After playing just three games for Nistru Otaci, he returned to the United States, and signed for the Harrisburg City Islanders in 2009. After completing his season with the Harrisburg City Islanders, Chencinski spent time training with Major League Soccer side Philadelphia Union.

VPS 

Expecting to start another season with Harrisburg, Chencinski was given the chance of a week-long trial with Finnish side VPS. After a successful trial, he was signed by the Finnish club to provide competition for the goalkeeper position.

He made his debut for VPS on February 5, 2011 in a 2–2 draw with FF Jaro in the Finnish League Cup.

Örebro SK 

On December 5, 2011, he was confirmed for the Swedish Allsvenskan side Örebro SK for the 2012 season.

Maccabi Tel Aviv 

In late December 2012 Chencinski was transferred from Örebro to Maccabi Tel Aviv in the Israeli Premier League, for an undisclosed transfer fee.

RoPS 

In January 2015, Chencinski left Israel and joined RoPS of Finland. RoPS would eventually finish in 2nd place during the 2015 Veikkausliiga, one point behind league winners SJK. Their finish earned the club entry into the first round of qualification for the 2016–17 UEFA Europa League.

FC Santa Claus (loan) 

In 2015, he briefly went on loan to FC Santa Claus in the third tier, who played in the same city as RoPS, after returning from injury.

Helsingborgs IF 

After his successful season in Finland, Chencinski joined Swedish club Helsingborg on December 8, 2015.

Shamrock Rovers 

Chencinski joined Shamrock Rovers on December 15, 2016. He made his League of Ireland debut on the opening day of the 2017 League of Ireland Premier Division season. Chencinski made his European debut keeping a clean sheet as Rovers beat Stjarnan men's football in the 2017–18 UEFA Europa League. He made four appearances keeping two clean sheets in that season's competition. In a game against Dundalk F.C. Chencinski was racially abused in July. After being the starting goalkeeper for the 2017 season, Chencinski left Rovers midway through his second season with the club after they signed Alan Mannus as a replacement.

International career 

Chancinski is eligible to play for the national teams of Canada, Israel and Poland.

Chencinski represented Canada at the 2005 Maccabiah Games.

On March 14, 2013, Chencinski received his first call up by the Canadian national team for friendlies against Japan and Belarus. Chencinski made his debut for the national team on March 25 starting the game against Belarus after Milan Borjan was benched following the loss to Japan, the game ended in a 2–0 defeat to the European nation.

Coaching career 

In 2013, he was one of the coaches of Maccabi Canada's youth soccer team.

Honours 

Maccabi Tel Aviv
 Israeli Premier League: 2012–13, 2013-2014

See also 

 List of select Jewish football (association; soccer) players

References

External links 

 Harrisburg City Islanders bio
 Detroit Ignition bio
 FDU Knights bio
 Twitter page

1984 births
Living people
Canadian expatriate sportspeople in the United States
Canadian expatriate soccer players
Canada men's international soccer players
Jewish Canadian sportspeople
Jewish Israeli sportspeople
Jewish footballers
Canadian soccer players
Detroit Ignition (MISL) players
Robert Morris Colonials men's soccer players
Expatriate soccer players in the United States
Expatriate footballers in Moldova
Expatriate footballers in Finland
Fairleigh Dickinson University alumni
Fairleigh Dickinson Knights men's soccer players
Association football goalkeepers
Maccabiah Games footballers
Penn FC players
Israeli footballers
Israeli emigrants to Canada
Israeli Canadian
Maccabiah Games competitors for Canada
Competitors at the 2005 Maccabiah Games
Major Indoor Soccer League (2001–2008) players
Jersey Express S.C. players
Footballers from Bat Yam
Toronto FC players
USL League Two players
USL Second Division players
Maccabi Tel Aviv F.C. players
Hakoah Maccabi Amidar Ramat Gan F.C. players
Hapoel Nir Ramat HaSharon F.C. players
Israeli Premier League players
Shamrock Rovers F.C. players
Allsvenskan players
League of Ireland players
Liga Leumit players
Israeli people of Polish-Jewish descent
Canadian people of Polish-Jewish descent
FC Santa Claus players
Canadian expatriate sportspeople in Ireland